York City Football Club, a professional association football club based in York, North Yorkshire, England, was founded in 1922. They were elected to play in the Midland League for the 1922–23 season. After seven seasons in the Midland League, York were elected to play in the Football League in 1929 and were placed in the Third Division North. The team reached the semi-final of the 1954–55 FA Cup, and were defeated by eventual winners Newcastle United in a replay, which is the furthest the club have reached in the competition. York played in the Third Division North until the 1958–59 season, when they were placed in the Fourth Division on league reorganisation. They won the first promotion in their history this season, after finishing third in the Fourth Division.

York were promoted to the Second Division in 1974 and the 1974–75 season saw them achieve their highest league placing after finishing in 15th place. Two successive relegations and a finish of 22nd in the Fourth Division saw the club apply for re-election to the Football League at the end of the 1977–78 season. York won their first and only title after finishing first in the Fourth Division in the 1983–84 season with 101 points, becoming the first team to reach a three-figure points total in a Football League season. The club's first play-off success came in the 1992–93 season, against Crewe Alexandra in the final. After a 1–1 extra-time draw, York won 5–3 in a penalty shoot-out at Wembley Stadium to earn promotion to the Second Division. The following season saw York compete in the Second Division play-off semi-final, where they were beaten 1–0 on aggregate by Stockport County.

York were relegated to the Conference National after finishing bottom of the Third Division in the 2003–04 season, ending 75 years of Football League membership. The team reached the 2009 FA Trophy Final in 2008–09, which was played at the new Wembley Stadium, where York were beaten 2–0 by Stevenage Borough. The 2011–12 season concluded with two victories at Wembley; after Newport County were defeated 2–0 in the 2012 FA Trophy Final, York's Football League status was restored with a 2–1 victory over Luton Town in the 2012 Conference Premier play-off Final. The club endured successive relegations from League Two to the National League North in the 2015–16 and 2016–17 seasons, but finished the latter with a 3–2 win over Macclesfield Town at Wembley in the 2017 FA Trophy Final. York spent five years in the National League North, being promoted to the National League via the play-offs in the 2021–22 season.

As at the end of 2021–22, the club's first team had spent 2 seasons in the second tier of English football, 38 in the third, 32 in the fourth and 20 in non-League football. The table details their achievements in first-team competitions, and records their top goalscorer and average home league attendance, for each completed season since their first in 1922–23.

Key

Key to league record:
P – Matches played
W – Matches won
D – Matches drawn
L – Matches lost
F – Goals for
A – Goals against
Pts – Points
Pos – Final position

Key to colours and symbols:

Key to divisions:
Midland – Midland League
Division 2 – Football League Second Division
Division 3 – Football League Third Division
Division 3N – Football League Third Division North
Division 4 – Football League Fourth Division
Conference – Conference National/Premier
League 2 – Football League Two
National – National League
National N – National League North

Key to rounds:
Group(N) – Group stage Northern section
QR1 – First qualifying round, etc.
R1 – First round, etc.
R1(N) – First round Northern section, etc.
QF(N) – Quarter-final Northern section
SF – Semi-final
SF(N) – Semi-final Northern section
RU – Runners-up
W – Winners
DNE – Did not enter

Details of abandoned competitions are shown in italics and appropriately footnoted.

Seasons

Notes

References

Seasons
 
York City F.C.
York City F.C. seasons